I Shing Temple or I Shing Kung is a temple in Tung Tau Wai, Wang Chau, Yuen Long District, Hong Kong. It is dedicated to Hung Shing and Che Kung.

History
The temple was built in 1718 by the residents of six villages of Wang Chau: Sai Tau Wai, Tung Tau Wai, Lam Uk Tsuen, Chung Sum Wai, Fuk Hing Tsuen and Yeung Uk Tsuen.

Conservation
A full restoration of the temple was undertaken by the Architectural Services Department in 1996. It was declared a monument the same year.

References

External links

 I Shing Temple on The Temple Trail website

Taoist temples in Hong Kong
Declared monuments of Hong Kong
Wang Chau (Yuen Long)
Religious buildings and structures completed in 1718